"Knock Out" is a song recorded by the hip hop duo GD & TOP for their self-entitled album.  Released through YG Entertainment, it was serviced to radio on January 3, 2011 as the final single from their album.  Upon its release, the song peaked in the Top 5 of the Gaon Music Chart and drew controversies over its lyrics.

Background 
The song "Knock Out" was the final single from GD & TOP's self-entitled album, and have been described as a "club" song due to its production. It was censored from major television corporations (MBC, SBS, and KBS) for its lyrics, which was deemed to be too "vulgar and explicit" for youth. A request was issued for the duo to record a "cleaner" version of the song if they want to continue performing it; the duo rejected the request and decided to continue promoting with their previous singles, "High High" and "Oh Yeah" instead. In 2012, "High High" and "Knock Out" were listed as one of the best K-Pop music videos of all time by Stereogum, ranking at fourth and seventh, respectively.

Charts and sales

Weekly charts

Sales

References

External links 

 

G-Dragon songs
T.O.P songs
2011 singles
2011 songs
Songs written by G-Dragon
Songs written by T.O.P
YG Entertainment singles